Marcelo Hugo Süller (born 29 October 1971) is an Argentine retired footballer who played primarily as forward.

Club career
Born in Buenos Aires, Süller began his career at All Boys. In the summer of 1991 he went on unsuccessful trial for Polish I liga site Wisła Kraków. Soon after that he signed with Igloopol Dębica. Representing the club in 1991–92 season Süller made 5 league appearances without any goal scored in Polish top-flight. He returned to Argentina as he transferred to All Boys in 1992 and played 16 games for the club. Between 1993 and 2000 he competed in Primera B Metropolitana and Primera C playing for Club Almagro, Deportivo Armenio and Club Comunicaciones.

Coaching career
In 2000 Süller coached Barracas Central.

Personal life
He is adoptive brother of Silvia Süller.

References

External links
 
 
 

Living people
1971 births
Argentine footballers
Association football forwards
Argentine football managers
All Boys footballers
Club Almagro players
Club Comunicaciones footballers
Igloopol Dębica players
Ekstraklasa players
Primera B Metropolitana players
Argentine expatriate footballers
Expatriate footballers in Poland
Argentine expatriate sportspeople in Poland
Footballers from Buenos Aires